Mauldslie Bridge is a three-segmental-arch bridge in Dalserf, South Lanarkshire, Scotland. It crosses the River Clyde between the A72 road and the former location of Mauldslie Castle. Built in 1861, and now a Category A listed structure, the bridge is believed to be the work of David Bryce. Mauldslie Castle West Lodge and archway stands at the western end of the bridge. They are listed separately at Historic Environment Scotland.

The bridge was built for James Hozier, 2nd Baron Newlands, to serve Mauldslie Castle, built by the Thomas, 5th Earl of Hyndford, in 1793. The castle was demolished in 1935. A seated-dog motif above the gate, which appears with an inscription of "Aye Ready", can also be found in the garden of the Marna gate lodge, to the south. That also is a listed structure.

Winston Churchill has crossed the bridge, to attend gatherings of Scottish gentry.

Repairs began on the bridge in 2019, with the hope of preserving it for future generations.

Bridge detail

See also
List of listed buildings in Dalserf, South Lanarkshire

References

Bridges across the River Clyde
Bridges completed in 1861
Stone bridges
1861 establishments in Scotland
Category A listed buildings in South Lanarkshire